Unimai is an islet of Nui atoll in the Pacific Ocean state of Tuvalu.

References

External links
Map of Nui showing Unimai

Islands of Tuvalu
Nui (atoll)